The Evangelical Social Congress (ESK) was a social-reform movement of German evangelists founded in Whitsuntide in 1890.

Various groups were united in the Congress, although, in the end, the Congress failed to set forth a united programme of "Christian socialism" (more so because people like Friedrich Naumann and Adolf Stoecker would depart from the Congress).

The Congress never carried a large membership, and was only marginal compared to the Verein für Socialpolitik, an organization that currently still exists.

Associated people
 Otto Baumgarten
 Paul Gohre
 Adolf von Harnack (longtime president of the Congress)
 Friedrich Naumann
 Martin Rade
 Paul Rohrbach
 Gerhart von Schulze-Gävernitz
 Walter Simons
 Adolf Stoecker
 Max Weber

Further reading

Lutheran organizations